Douglas Garven Alexander (born 26 October 1967) is a Labour politician who served as Member of Parliament (MP) for Paisley and Renfrewshire South, previously Paisley South, from 1997 until his defeat in 2015. During this time, he served as Chancellor of the Duchy  of Lancaster, Scottish Secretary, Transport Secretary and International Development Secretary in the Cabinet under Prime Ministers Tony Blair and Gordon Brown. He subsequently served in Ed Miliband's Shadow Cabinet as Shadow Secretary of State for Work and Pensions and Shadow Foreign Secretary.

Alexander was first elected to Parliament in the Paisley South by-election in 1997. He was Minister of State for the Cabinet Office from 2002 to 2003. In 2003, he was promoted to Minister for the Cabinet Office and Chancellor of the Duchy of Lancaster. In 2004, he was appointed Minister of State for Trade, serving jointly in the Foreign and Commonwealth Office (FCO) and in the Department of Trade and Industry.

At the 2005 general election, the Paisley South constituency was abolished and Alexander was elected to represent its successor seat of Paisley and Renfrewshire South. Following the election, Alexander was appointed Minister of State for Europe. During this period, Alexander attended Cabinet and was made a member of the Privy council. In 2006, Alexander was appointed to serve jointly as both Secretary of State for Scotland and Secretary of State for Transport. In 2007, when Gordon Brown became Prime Minister, he appointed Alexander as Secretary of State for International Development.

After Labour lost the 2010 general election Alexander co-chaired David Miliband's leadership campaign. When Ed Miliband became the party's leader, Alexander was elected to the Shadow cabinet and was made the Shadow Secretary of State for Work and Pensions. He held this position until a 2011 reshuffle, when he was appointed Shadow Foreign Secretary. In October 2013, he was appointed by Miliband as the party's Chair of General Election Strategy. In 2015, his was among the 40 seats lost by Labour in Scotland.

In December 2022, Alexander sought out a return to parliament by applying to be Labour’s parliamentary candidate for East Lothian in the next general election, the party’s #1 target seat in Scotland, which is currently held by the Alba Party’s Kenny MacAskill, who was elected for the SNP. He won the selection to stand for Labour in the constituency in February 2023.

Early life and career
Alexander was born in Glasgow, the son of Joyce O. Alexander and Douglas N. Alexander, a Church of Scotland minister. Much of his childhood was spent in Bishopton in Renfrewshire. Alexander attended his local comprehensive school Park Mains High School in Erskine, also in Renfrewshire, from where he joined the Labour Party as a schoolboy in 1982.

In 1984 he won a Scottish scholarship to attend Lester B. Pearson United World College of the Pacific in Canada, where he gained the International Baccalaureate Diploma, returning to Scotland to study politics and modern history at the University of Edinburgh. He spent 1988/89, the third of his four undergraduate years, at the University of Pennsylvania as part of the exchange scheme between the two universities. When studying in America, he worked for Michael Dukakis during the 1988 American presidential election campaign, and also worked for a Democratic senator in Washington DC. He graduated from the University of Edinburgh with a first-class degree in 1990.

In 1990, Douglas worked as a speech writer and parliamentary researcher for Shadow Trade and Industry Secretary Gordon Brown. He returned to Edinburgh to study for an LLB at the University of Edinburgh, where he won the Novice Moot Trophy and graduated with distinction in 1993. He then qualified as a Scottish solicitor. On qualifying as a solicitor he worked for a firm of solicitors in Edinburgh that provided legal services to Trade Union members and specialised in industrial injury cases.

Political career

Perth and Kinross
Whilst still studying in 1995 and with friends in the local Constituency Labour Party and the backing of his mentor shadow chancellor Gordon Brown, he was selected to be The Labour Party in Scotland candidate at the Perth and Kinross by-election caused by the death of the Conservative MP Nicholas Fairbairn. The by-election in the highly volatile Tory seat of Perth and Kinross came in the middle of the John Major government and was won by Roseanna Cunningham of the Scottish National Party, but Alexander received enough votes to push the Conservative candidate into third place. It was a seat where Labour had never previously done particularly well, and the result, which saw Labour overtake the Conservatives and move up to second place, broke several post war election records. This brought him to the attention of party leader Tony Blair, and shortly after his defeat by the SNP he was welcomed at The Labour Party in Scotland Conference in the Eden Court Theatre in Inverness where he spoke immediately before Blair in the critical debate on abolition of Clause 4.4 of the Labour Party Constitution.

When the Perth and Kinross constituency was abolished, Alexander was chosen to be the Labour candidate in the newly drawn Perth constituency at the 1997 general election. Once again Labour achieved a further swing with Alexander securing 24.8% share of the vote compared to 22.9% achieved during the by election, though pushed into third place.

Member of Parliament
On 28 July 1997, Gordon McMaster, the Labour Member of Parliament for Paisley South, committed suicide. Alexander, who grew up in Renfrewshire, was chosen to contest the by-election and he was duly elected to serve as the Member of Parliament for Paisley South on 6 November 1997. In June 2001 he was returned to Westminster with an increased majority. Following the General Election in May 2005 Douglas was re-elected, becoming MP for the new constituency of Paisley and Renfrewshire South, as well as promoted to Minister of State for Europe attending Cabinet at the Foreign Office. At the 2010 General Election Alexander was successfully re-elected as MP for Paisley and Renfrewshire South with a majority of 13,232 votes. He lost his seat to 20-year-old Mhairi Black of the Scottish National Party at the General Election on 8 May 2015 with a swing against him of 26.9%.

Minister of state
Alexander took a successful co-ordinating role in his party's campaign for the 2001 general election. In May 2002, Alexander was transferred to the Cabinet Office as Minister of State. As Minister of State for the Cabinet Office, Alexander oversaw the work of the government's Strategy Unit, the Central Office of Information, and the Civil Service.

In June 2003 Alexander was promoted to Minister for the Cabinet Office and Chancellor of the Duchy of Lancaster, and in September 2004 was moved to Minister of State for Trade at both the Department of Trade and Industry and the Foreign and Commonwealth Office.

Cabinet minister
Following the 2005 general election, he was given the role of Minister of State for Europe, part of the Foreign Office, with special provision to attend Cabinet. During the United Kingdom’s Presidency of the Council of the European Union, he contributed directly to successful negotiations on agreement of the Multiannual Financial Framework. On 7 June 2005, he was made a Member of the Privy Council.

On 5 May 2006, he was appointed Secretary of State for Transport and, simultaneously, Secretary of State for Scotland, replacing Alistair Darling. On 10 August 2006, Alexander was helicoptered by the Royal Air Force from Scotland to London to join Home Secretary John Reid, in leading the UK Government’s response to the 2006 transatlantic aircraft plot and attend meetings of COBRA, the government emergencies committee. He worked with police, Intelligence Agencies, the Airlines and the US Department of Homeland Security.

During his time as Scottish Secretary, Alexander oversaw the running of the 2007 Scottish Parliament election. Following Gordon Brown's appointment as Prime Minister on 27 June 2007, he appointed Douglas Alexander as Secretary of State for International Development. During this time Alexander served as a governor of the World Bank, the African Development Bank, the Inter-American Development Bank the Caribbean Development Bank, and the Asian Development Bank.

Election campaign roles
Alexander took a central role in the first Scottish Parliament elections in 1999 which saw Donald Dewar elected as the first First Minister of Scotland. Alexander is credited with devising the strategy for the campaign, including the successful 'Divorce is an Expensive Business' messaging unveiled at the Labour Party in Scotland Conference in Glasgow (March 1999). Labour secured 56 seats under the Proportional Representation system, nine short of an overall majority, and agreed to enter a coalition with the 17-strong Liberal Democrats to for the first Government in the newly established Scottish Parliament. Alexander also coordinated Labour’s successful 2001 General Election Campaign which resulted in another Labour landslide and the Party winning 413 of the 659 seats available: securing a 167-seat majority in the House of Commons. Alexander was appointed by Tony Blair to Labour’s National Executive Committee in 2003 and was appointed by Gordon Brown to be Labour’s General Election Coordinator for the 2010 general election campaign. This campaign saw the first televised Leaders' debates, and Alexander was part of the core team preparing Gordon Brown for each debate, as well as devising the strategy and messaging for the campaign across the UK which would ultimately deny David Cameron's Conservatives a Majority in May 2010. Later in that year Alexander accepted the role as co-chair of David Miliband's campaign for the leadership of the Labour party. He subsequently was Ed Miliband's chair of general election strategy for the Labour 2015 general election campaign.

Opposition to antisemitism
In September 2012 Alexander gave an interview to the Evening Standard newspaper criticising Ken Livingstone's election campaign and calling out anti-Semitic comments made by the former London Mayor. He said Livingstone paid the "deserved price" when he lost the London mayoral election. Alexander said: "Ken’s campaign too often looked like the past rather than the future and when I saw his remarks about the Jewish community in London in particular, I didn’t just think it was ill-advised, I thought it was wrong". Livingstone hit back on Twitter, saying the Shadow Foreign Secretary "represents a failed New Labour project that lost millions of votes". He also invited him to discuss the issue on his radio show.

Alexander has been a vocal critic of anti-Semitism within the Labour Party and is a supporting member of one of the oldest socialist societies affiliated to the Party: the Jewish Labour Movement. In 2011, Alexander was among the first to publicly condemn Paul Flynn, the Labour MP for Newport West for his comments regarding the religion of Britain's first Jewish ambassador to Israel. Alexander, who at the time was serving as Labour's Shadow Foreign Secretary, said in response to Flynn's comments about Ambassador Matthew Gould that: "The faith of any British diplomat is irrelevant to their capability to their job. To make suggestions otherwise is wrong and offensive".

Public speeches
On 29 June 2010, five years after the Make Poverty History March in Edinburgh, Alexander gave a speech to the Labour Campaign for International Development about the progress made towards achieving the Gleneagles Summit Goals and on the future of International Development.

On 12 October 2011, Alexander delivered the Andrew John Williamson Memorial Lecture, at Stirling University. In his lecture entitled: "A Better Nation?" A Personal Reflection on Scotland's Future. Alexander explored the difference between the political ideologies of nationalism and socialism and outlined a strategy for Scottish Labour to reclaim the mantel of devolution and successfully defeat the campaign for Scottish separation.

On 17 January 2013 in a speech to the foreign policy think-tank Chatham House, Alexander outlined his support for the UK to remain a full member state of the European Union but would not support a federal United States of Europe.

On 3 May 2013, Alexander delivered the 4th Judith Hart Memorial Lecture for which he received a lot of media attention for addressing the issue of Scottish Independence ahead of the referendum to be held the following year. Alexander paid tribute to Judith Hart’s "strong sense of solidarity" advocating for Scotland to vote to remain part of the United Kingdom, saying: "Walking away from others has never been our way – walking with others has been our heritage and to my mind should be our future".

Expenses controversy
During the 2009 MP expenses scandal, Alexander was one of three Labour ministers who "quietly repaid more £50,000 in expenses". It emerged he had repaid more than £12,000 that he had previously claimed in expenses on his taxpayer funded second home while also receiving income from a tenant at the same second home. This represented double funding for his second home and was against the expenses rules.

Post-parliamentary career
After leaving public office, Alexander became a Fisher Family Fellow at Harvard University where he served as a Senior Fellow at the Belfer Center for Science and International Affairs (2016-2022). He has served as a visiting professor at the University of Chicago (2015) and is currently a visiting professor at New York University (Abu Dhabi). He is also currently a visiting professor at King’s College London's Policy Institute. In November 2015 Alexander started working as a senior advisor to Bono, helping secure investment to tackle global poverty. In March 2016 Alexander joined the Pinsent Masons law firm as a "strategic advisor". He remains a Member of the UK Privy Council, a Council Member on the European Council of Foreign Relations, and a Trustee of the Royal United Services Institute.

He is a Council Member of the European Council on Foreign Relations, a Trustee of the Royal United Services Institute, and Chair of the Programme Committee at The Ditchley Foundation

Broadcasting
Alexander has written and presented programmes for BBC Radio 4 including: the documentary: "A Culture of Encounter" (2017), in which Alexander brought together experts and community organisations to explore the cultural, economic, and political polarising forces in society. He also authored and presented the three part "Belonging" series (2018) comprising these episodes: 'Old Ties', 'New Bonds', and 'Tomorrow’s Stories'. This series, in which Alexander explored the erosion of class, religion and security in society to explain why the ties that previously gave so many a shared sense of belonging have weakened, was nominated by BBC Radio 4 for the International URTI Radio Grand Prix (31st edition) Prize for Public Service Media and Social Networks.

At the end of 2019 Alexander authored and presented a programme called: A Guide to Disagreeing Better. This programme was broadcast in January 2020 and explores why public discourse has become so ill-tempered and lacking in respect. Alexander interviews a range of contributors with personal tales about how to disagree better. The programme received widespread news coverage.

Ahead of COP26 in 2021, Alexander authored and presented a further BBC Radio 4 programme called 'Glasgow: Our Last Best Hope', an essential guide to COP26, its hope of success and what the transition to net zero could mean for Glaswegians and all of us, with contributions from John Kerry, Christian Figueres, Mark Carney and Alok Sharma.

In May 2022, Alexander authored and presented 'Connections' which examined whether recent crises - from Covid to the Ukraine war - have helped bring people together or driven them apart.

Bullying claims while chair of UNICEF UK

Douglas Alexander served as chair of the board of trustees for UNICEF UK from June 2018 to September 2020. Alexander stepped down as chair in September 2020 following accusations of bullying by then-executive director Sasha Deshmukh, although he had the support of the board. A review by Morgan, Lewis & Bockius which reported in January 2021 described the bullying allegations made by Deshmukh as "unsubstantiated", and in respect of complaints made by three other employees, said that although Alexander's manner "did cause some discomfort and upset to the three employees", that "when viewed objectively, it did not amount to bullying".

University of Edinburgh 
In August 2021, Alexander was appointed a General Court Assessor at the University of Edinburgh Court, his alma mater. Alexander is a member of the University of Edinburgh Court, the university's highest governing body, and the General Council Business Committee and the Policy and Resources Committee.

Return to politics 

In February 2023, Alexander was selected as the Labour candidate for the parliamentary seat of East Lothian for the next general election, which is one of the Labour Party's top target seats in Scotland.

Publications
Alexander has written numerous pieces for publication in national newspapers in the UK and the USA including The New York Times, the Los Angeles Times, The Guardian, and The Boston Globe.

He has contributed to, authored and edited several books: "New Scotland New Britain" (1999), "Europe in a Global Age" (2005), "Serving a Cause, Serving a Community" (2006), "Renewing our offer not retracing our steps", The Purple Book (2011), "Influencing Tomorrow: Future Challenges for British Foreign Policy (2013), and "Britain in a complex world", Why Vote Labour 2015: The Essential Guide (2014) and "Rethink: How We Can Make A Better World" (2021), a collection of essays focused on a global 'reset moment' with leading international figures giving glimpses of a better future after the pandemic including contributions from Pope Francis, Niall Ferguson, Samantha Power and Paul Krugman.

Personal life 
Douglas married Jacqueline Christian in 2000, and together they have a daughter and a son. His sister, Wendy Alexander, was also involved in politics as an MSP until 2011 and briefly as the Leader of the Labour Party in the Scottish Parliament until she resigned in 2008. His father, a Church of Scotland minister, conducted the funeral of the inaugural First Minister of Scotland, Donald Dewar at Glasgow Cathedral in 2000. He is the great-nephew of Cecil Frances Alexander.

References

Bibliography
Torrance, David, The Scottish Secretaries (Birlinn 2006)

External links
Douglas Alexander MP official site
Rt Hon Douglas Alexander MP at the Foreign Office
Douglas Alexander at the Department of Trade and Industry
Douglas Alexander at Dfid

Steering safely down the middle, Gillian Bowditch interview in The Sunday Times Scotland, 24 September 2006
Douglas Alexander profile in The New Statesman

|-

|-

|-

|-

|-

|-

|-

|-

|-

|-

|-

1967 births
Living people
Alumni of the University of Edinburgh School of Law
Chancellors of the Duchy of Lancaster
Members of the Parliament of the United Kingdom for Paisley constituencies
Members of the Privy Council of the United Kingdom
People educated at a United World College
People educated at Park Mains High School
Politicians from Glasgow
Scottish solicitors
Secretaries of State for Scotland
Secretaries of State for Transport (UK)
UK MPs 1997–2001
UK MPs 2001–2005
UK MPs 2005–2010
UK MPs 2010–2015
People from Bishopton